First Baptist Church is a historic Baptist church located at Newfane in Niagara County, New York.  It is a Greek Revival style cobblestone church constructed in 1843.  It is one of approximately 47 cobblestone buildings in Niagara County.

First Baptist Church was formed in 1829, when Andrew Jackson took office as the seventh president of the United States, four years after the opening of the Erie Canal.  In 1845 the church took a courageous moral position against slavery. At that time the Fugitive Slave Act prohibited speaking against slavery or helping slaves escape.  The church did both.

It was listed on the National Register of Historic Places in 2004.

The church is part of the American Baptist Churches in the U.S.A.

External links
 First Baptist Church 
 Article in Lockport Union Sun and Journal

References

Baptist churches in New York (state)
Churches on the National Register of Historic Places in New York (state)
Churches completed in 1843
19th-century Baptist churches in the United States
Cobblestone architecture
Churches in Niagara County, New York
1829 establishments in New York (state)
National Register of Historic Places in Niagara County, New York